Co-opetition: A Revolution Mindset that Combines Competition and Cooperation is a non-fiction book on coopetition (co-operative competition), business strategy, and game theory by Adam M. Brandenburger and Barry J. Nalebuff. The book was initially published by Crown Business on May 1, 1996. As of 2015, the book is still available in its 9th printing.

Overview
Coopetition or co-opetition is a neologism coined to describe the concept of cooperation between competitors. Coopetition is a portmanteau of cooperation and competition.

The text discusses at length the notion of coopetition, a business strategy gained from game theory to demonstrate when it is better for competitors to work together rather than to go up against one another in contest. The authors use many examples to show the simultaneous interplay between competition and cooperation. Their research added to previous industry analysis such as Michael Porter’s five forces model, which focused almost entirely on competition between businesses.

Review

—Review by Strategy+Business

See also
Complementors
Competitive altruism
Frenemy
Negarchy
Six forces model
Thinking Strategically: The Competitive Edge in Business, Politics, and Everyday Life also co-authored by Barry Nalebuff

References

External links
Official website
Review of Barry J. Nalebuff and Adam N. Brandenburger, Co-opetition 1. Revolutionary Mindset that Redefines Competition and Co-operation 2. The Game Theory Strategy that's Changing the Game of Business

1996 non-fiction books
Game theory
Popular science books
American non-fiction books
Business books